Ford Library may refer to:

Gerald R. Ford Presidential Library, at the University of Michigan
Henry Ford Centennial Library, the main branch of the Dearborn Public Libraries
Ford Library, the library of Duke University's Fuqua School of Business
M. Burch Tracy Ford Library, the library of Miss Porter's School